Ichneutica thalassarche is a moth of the family Noctuidae. This species is endemic to New Zealand and is only found in the Chatham Islands. It has been collected at Chatham Island, Pitt Island and Rangatira Island. The life history of this species is unknown as are the host species of its larvae. The adults of this species are large with a pale grey throax and forewing. A diagnostic feature is the pattern on its forewing which is a white subterminal line joined by black "teeth" markings. This species has been recorded as a winter flyer having been collected in June to August.

Taxonomy 
This species was described by Robert Hoare in 2019. The male holotype specimen was collected by L. Smith on Pitt Island in the Chatham Islands and is held at the Entomology Research Museum, Lincoln University.

Description 
The adult male of this species has a wingspan of 47 mm and the female has a wingspan 50 mm.  This species is large with a pale grey throax and forewing. A diagnostic feature of this species is the pattern on its forewing which is a white subterminal line joined by black "teeth" markings.

Distribution 
This species is endemic to New Zealand and has only been found on the Chatham Islands. It has been collected at Chatham Island, Pitt Island and Rangatira Island.

Behaviour 
This species has been recorded as a winter flyer having been collected in June to August.

Life history and host species 
The life history of this species is unknown as are the host species of its larvae.

References

Moths described in 2019
Moths of New Zealand
 Noctuinae
Endemic fauna of New Zealand
Taxa named by Robert Hoare
Endemic moths of New Zealand